EUB may refer to:

 Eidsvoll Ullensaker Blad, a Norwegian newspaper
 Eisenbahn-Unfalluntersuchungsstelle des Bundes, the German Federal Railway Accident Investigation Board
 Electric upright bass, a musical instrument
 Energy and Utilities Board of the Government of Alberta, Canada; now defunct
 Euabalong West railway station, in New South Wales, Australia
 European University of Bangladesh
 Evangelical United Brethren Church, a former Christian denomination in the United States